Van Matre is a surname. Notable people with the surname include:

Joseph Van Matre (1828–1892), Union Army soldier
Steve Van Matre (born 1941), American environmental activist, author, and educator

Surnames of Dutch origin